Synthemis tasmanica is a species of dragonfly in the family Synthemistidae, 
known as the Tasmanian swamp tigertail. 
It is found in Tasmania, Australia, where it inhabits seepages and bogs.
It is a slender, medium-sized dragonfly with black and yellow markings.

Gallery

See also
 List of Odonata species of Australia

References

Synthemistidae
Odonata of Australia
Endemic fauna of Australia
Taxa named by Robert John Tillyard
Insects described in 1910